Henry Holt Henley  (died 1748) of Leigh, Somerset, and Colway, Lyme Regis, Dorset, was a British lawyer and politician who sat in the House of Commons between 1722 and 1748.

Henley was the only son of Henry Henley, MP of Leigh and Colway and his wife Catherine Holt, daughter of Richard Holt, MP of Nursted, Hampshire. He was admitted at Middle Temple in 1716, and was called to the bar in 1722. He married  Sarah Cornish daughter of Henry Cornish, MP of St. Lawrence Jewry, London.

Henley was elected as a Whig Member of Parliament for Lyme Regis at the  1722 general election.  He was Mayor of Lyme Regis for 1724 to 1725. He was defeated at the 1727 general election but was seated on petition on 28 February 1728 after John Burridge, as mayor, had illegally returned himself. In 1728 he was appointed to a lucrative sinecure post as Clerk of the Pipe, which had been held by his brother-in-law, Anthony Cornish. He was Mayor of Lyme Regis again for 1731 to 1732. At the 1734 general election, he was re-elected  MP for Lyme Regis. He was  Mayor of Lyme Regis for a third term for the year 1738 to 1739. At the 1741 general election, he was returned to Parliament unopposed. He was  Mayor of Lyme Regis for the year 1746 to 1747.  He was re-elected MP at the 1747 general election. During his time in Parliament, he voted for the Administration in all recorded divisions. He was sometime Recorder of Lyme Regis.

Henley's first wife died on 25 April 1731 and he succeeded his father in 1733.  He married as his second wife, Catherine Hare, daughter of Rev. Hugh Charles Hare of Docking, Norfolk on 8 May 1739. He died on 8 May 1748. He had a son and three daughters by his first wife.

References

1748 deaths
Members of the Parliament of Great Britain for English constituencies
British MPs 1722–1727
British MPs 1727–1734
British MPs 1734–1741
British MPs 1741–1747